Bojan Jokić (born 17 May 1986) is a Slovenian professional footballer who plays as a centre-back or left-back. Jokić amassed 100 caps with the Slovenia national team between 2006 and 2019.

Club career
Jokić made his senior debut in 2003 with local club Triglav Kranj, and moved to Gorica in 2005. He appeared regularly for the side during his two-year spell, also being a part of the squad which was crowned champions in the 2005–06 campaign.

On 5 July 2007, Jokić moved abroad for the first time in his career, after agreeing to a four-year deal with Ligue 1 club Sochaux. He made his debut in the competition on 11 August, starting in a 3–1 home loss against Le Mans.

On 30 January 2010, Jokić joined Chievo on loan until June. On 22 May, after appearing regularly, he joined the Gialloblu permanently.

On 5 July 2013, Jokić moved to La Liga side Villarreal, signing a four-year deal with the club, after his link with Chievo expired. He made his debut in the competition on 29 September, starting in a 1–0 loss at Real Betis.

On 8 January 2016, Jokić moved to Championship side Nottingham Forest on loan for the remainder of the 2015–16 season. He made his debut on 9 January, as a substitute in the FA Cup Third Round victory over Queens Park Rangers.

On 21 January 2017, Jokić signed a one-and-a-half-year contract with the Russian Premier League side FC Ufa. On 2 August 2018, he scored a late equalizer that made the score 1–1 against the Slovenian club NK Domžale in an away leg of their UEFA Europa League qualifier. As the first leg ended with a score of 0–0, this goal allowed Ufa to advance on away goals rule. It was also the club's first goal in European competition, as they were making their debut on that level.

International career
Jokić made his international debut with the Slovenia national team on 28 February 2006, in a 1–0 win against Cyprus. He featured regularly for the national side, and scored his first international goal on 3 March 2010, scoring the last of a 4–1 victory over Qatar.

On 1 June 2010, Jokić was named among the 23-man squad for the 2010 FIFA World Cup. He appeared in all three matches during the tournament, as Slovenia were knocked out in the group stage.

On 16 November 2019, Jokić played his 100th match for Slovenia against Latvia.

Career statistics

Club

International goals
Scores and results list Slovenia's goal tally first, score column indicates score after each Jokić goal.

Honours
Gorica
Slovenian PrvaLiga: 2005–06

See also
Slovenian international players
List of footballers with 100 or more caps

References

External links

NZS profile 

1986 births
Living people
Sportspeople from Kranj
Slovenian footballers
Slovenian expatriate footballers
Association football defenders
NK Triglav Kranj players
ND Gorica players
FC Sochaux-Montbéliard players
A.C. ChievoVerona players
Villarreal CF players
Nottingham Forest F.C. players
FC Ufa players
Slovenian Second League players
Slovenian PrvaLiga players
Ligue 1 players
Serie A players
La Liga players
English Football League players
Russian Premier League players
Expatriate footballers in France
Slovenian expatriate sportspeople in France
Expatriate footballers in Italy
Slovenian expatriate sportspeople in Italy
Expatriate footballers in Spain
Slovenian expatriate sportspeople in Spain
Expatriate footballers in England
Slovenian expatriate sportspeople in England
Expatriate footballers in Russia
Slovenian expatriate sportspeople in Russia
Slovenia youth international footballers
Slovenia under-21 international footballers
Slovenia international footballers
2010 FIFA World Cup players
FIFA Century Club